Notable people with the surname Alavi include:

 Ali Alavi, Theoretical chemist
 Patrick Alavi, a German Musician
 Abass Alavi, is Professor of Radiology and Neurology
 Abrar Alvi, was an Indian film writer, director and actor
 Ameer Faisal Alvi Awan, was the first General Officer Commanding of the elite Special Service Group of Pakistan Army
 Arif Alvi, is president of Pakistan
 Bozorg Alavi, was an influential Iranian writer, novelist, and political intellectual
 Hakim ‘Alavi, was a royal Persian physician of the 18th century
 Hasan Jamil Alvi, is a former Pakistani cricketer
 Moniza Alvi, is a Pakistani-British poet and writer
 Rashid Alvi, a politician from Indian National Congress party is presently a Member of the Parliament of India
 Samroj Ajmi Alvi, is a Bangladeshi actress and model.
 Sajida Alvi, is a female academic of Pakistani origin in Canada
 Salman Alvi, is a Pakistani Ghazal and Semi-Classical Vocalist
 Sattar Alvi, is a Pakistan Air Force's veteran fighter pilot and retired Air Commodore of Pakistan Air Force .
 Shamsur Rehman Alvi, is a journalist with Hindustan Times
 Suroosh Alvi, is a Pakistani Canadian journalist and film-maker
 Shahood Alvi, is a television actor, Pakistan
 Mahmoud Alavi, is the Minister of Intelligence of Iran
 Mohammad Alavi (nuclear engineer), is an Iranian nuclear engineer
 Mohammad Alavi Gorgani, is a leading scholar in Najaf, Iraq
 Mohammad Alvi, is an Iranian footballer
 Yousef Alavi, is a mathematician who specializes in combinatorics and graph theory

External links
 http://www.palikanon.com/english/pali_names/aa/aalavii.htm Alavi in Buddhist Dictionary of Pali Proper Names

Arabic-language surnames
Shi'ite surnames